The Battle of Newtownbutler took place near Enniskillen in County Fermanagh, Ireland, in 1689 and was part of the Williamite War in Ireland between the forces of William III and Mary II and those of King James II.

The war in Western Ulster
In Enniskillen, armed Williamite civilians drawn from the local Protestant population organised a formidable irregular military force. The armed civilians of Enniskillen ignored an order from Robert Lundy that they should fall back to Derry and instead launched guerrilla attacks against the Jacobites. Operating with Enniskillen as a base, they carried out raids against the Jacobite forces in Connacht and Ulster plundering Trillick, burning Augher Castle and raiding Clones.

A Jacobite army of about 3,000 men, led by the 1st Viscount Mountcashel (in the Jacobite peerage), advanced on them from Dublin. Lord Mountcashel's men consisted of three regiments of infantry and two of dragoons. The regiments included his own regiment Mountcashel (approx 650 men) in 13 companies, The O'Brien regiment, also 13 companies of 650 men and the Lord Bophin (Burke) regiment. He also had the dragoon regiments of Cotter and Clare each with seven companies of about 350 dragoons. On 28 July 1689, Mountcashel's force encamped near Enniskillen and bombarded the Williamite outpost of Crom Castle to the south-east of Enniskillen.

The battle 
Two days later, they were confronted by about 2,000 Williamite 'Inniskilliniers' under Colonel Berry, Colonel William Wolseley and Gustave Hamilton. The Jacobite dragoons under Anthony Hamilton stumbled into an ambush laid by Berry's men near Lisnaskea and were routed, taking 230 casualties. Mountcashel managed to drive off Berry's cavalry with his main force, but was then faced with the bulk of the Williamite strength under Wolseley. There is some debate in the sources over troop numbers, though it is thought that Mountcashel had a large number of poorly armed conscripts. Unwisely, Mountcashel halted and drew up his men for battle about a mile south of Newtownbutler.

Williamite histories claim many of the Jacobite troops fled as the first shots were fired and up to 1,500 of them were hacked down or drowned in Upper Lough Erne when pursued by the Williamite cavalry. Of 500 men who tried to swim across the Lough only one survived. Lord Mountcashel, the Jacobite commander, along with about 400 Jacobite officers, were captured and later exchanged for Williamite prisoners; the other Jacobites were killed. These claims seem unlikely for several reasons: each Irish regiment included approximately 40 officers.  The entire force therefore would have included only approximately 200 officers.  Many of these officers are accounted for in an October 1689 roll call which shows approximately 15-20% change in the officer roll call since July for the infantry regiments and 5% for the dragoons. This would total some 20-30 officers in total. Also, the Mountcashel regiment whose roll call for October shows that companies which would normally have 50-60 men had around 25 which would result in a loss of approximately 300-400 men for this regiment.  The Cotter and Clare dragoons who rode away from the battle did not have significant losses, based on the October 1689 roll call. Assuming the other two infantry regiments suffered similar losses would give a total loss of 1200 - 1300. Given their officers are recorded in the October roll and they show fewer losses than the Mountcashel regiment among officers there may have been fewer losses in the ranks also.  The Williamite histories acknowledge they captured approximately 400 including men who were later sent to Derry, which would give a loss of killed, wounded and missing of 800-900 and likely less. This number is necessarily an estimate based on the available data but should be contrasted with Williamite claims that they killed and drowned 2000. It appears likely that a couple hundred men of Mountcashel's regiment may have fled into the bogs toward Lough Erne and some of them who made it to the river tried to swim and were drowned leading to the story of the hundreds drowned.

Lord Mountcashel was wounded by a bullet and narrowly avoided being killed. He later escaped from Enniskillen and returned to lead the Irish Brigade in the French army. The Jacobite colonel Sir Thomas Newcomen, 5th Baronet was killed.

The Williamite victory at Newtownbutler ensured that a landing by the Duke of Schomberg in County Down in August 1689 was unopposed.

The battle is still commemorated by the Orange Order in Ulster, and is mentioned in the traditional unionist song, "The Sash".

The Battle is significant in another way in that the regiments on both sides went on to have long and famous histories on the Williamite side - the Innsikilling Regiment 27th foot and on the Jacobite side the Clare and Mountcashel/Lee/Bulkeley regiments of the Irish Brigade. The two Irish regiments would face off again at the Battle of Fontenoy in 1745, where the Irish Brigade famously drove the British army from the battlefield with a charge in the final stage of the battle.

See also
27th (Inniskilling) Regiment of Foot

References

Sources
Kevin Haddick Flynn, Sarsfield and the Jacobites, Mercier, London 2003, .

External links
BBC NI Timeline via archive.org

1689 in Ireland
Battles of the Williamite War in Ireland
Military history of County Fermanagh
17th century in County Fermanagh